Penicillium clavigerum is a fungus species of the genus of Penicillium which produces fumigaclavine A and fumigaclavine B

See also
List of Penicillium species

References

Further reading
 
 

clavigerum
Fungi described in 1923